Karrakatta is a suburb of Perth, Western Australia, located within the City of Nedlands and 7 km west of the central business district. Its postcode is 6010.

Karrakatta is composed of two distinct areas, due to the Fremantle railway line passing through the suburb. On the south side is Karrakatta Cemetery, which began service in 1899, with a small industrial area occupied by monument builders, associated companies and the depot for City of Nedlands.

The other area north of the railway line and Karrakatta railway station is occupied by the Australian Defence Force's Irwin Army Barracks.

See also
 Karrakatta Club

Notes

 
Suburbs of Perth, Western Australia
Suburbs in the City of Nedlands